IOMA is a fad evidence-based skincare brand from France. It was founded in 2008 and it is now present in around 300 stores in France and in several other countries including the United States.

Press
Reuters Sept 1, 2008
 Cosmetiques hebdo Nov 2010 (French)
Sept 8, 2011
The Huffington Post Sept 7, 2011: Machines and Microchips

References

External links

Chemical companies established in 2008
Cosmetics companies of France
French companies established in 2008
Companies based in Paris